Saetheriella is a genus of North American non-biting midges in the subfamily Orthocladiinae of the bloodworm family (Chironomidae).

Genera & Species
S. amplicristata Halvorsen, 1982

References

Chironomidae
Diptera of North America